Trichura is a genus of moths in the subfamily Arctiinae erected by Jacob Hübner in 1819.

Species
 Trichura aurifera Butler, 1876
 Trichura cerberus Pallas, 1772
 Trichura coarctata Drury, 1773
 Trichura cyanea Schaus, 1872
 Trichura dixanthia Hampson, 1898
 Trichura druryi Hübner, 1826
 Trichura esmeralda Walker, 1854
 Trichura fasciata Rothschild, 1911
 Trichura frigida (Burmeister, 1878)
 Trichura fulvicaudata Lathy, 1899
 Trichura fumida Kaye, 1914
 Trichura grandis Kaye, 1911
 Trichura latifascia Walker, 1854
 Trichura mathina Druce, 1898
 Trichura melanosoma Hampson, 1898
 Trichura pusilla Rothschild, 1911
 Trichura viridis Gaede, 1926

References

Arctiini